The Health Research Authority (HRA) is an arm’s length body of the Department of Health and Social Care (DHSC) in England. The HRA exists to provide a unified national system for the governance of health research. The current chair of the HRA is Professor Sir Terence Stephenson, who succeeded Sir Jonathan Montgomery.

History 
The formation of the HRA came as a result of reorganisation of the National Health Service (NHS) of England outlined in the Health and Social Care Act 2012, and took on the functions of the National Research Ethics Service. Originally established as a special health authority on 1 December 2011, it became a non-departmental public body on 1 January 2015 under the Care Act 2014.

See also 

 National Institute for Health and Care Research (NIHR)
 Medical Research Council
 National Institute for Health and Care Excellence (NICE)

References

External links 

2005 establishments in England
English medical research
Department of Health and Social Care
Government agencies established in 2005
Health in the London Borough of Southwark
Non-departmental public bodies of the United Kingdom government
Organisations based in the London Borough of Southwark
National Health Service (England)